The white-crowned cuckoo or white-crowned koel (Cacomantis leucolophus) is a species of cuckoo in the family Cuculidae. It was originally described by Salomon Müller as Cuculus leucolophus. It was later placed in the monotypic genus Caliechthrus, but most taxonomists place it the genus Cacomantis because it has a similar song to other cuckoos in this genus and it is genetically similar to the pallid cuckoo (Cacomantis pallidus). It is found in New Guinea and neighbouring Salawati Island.

References

 BirdLife International 2004. Caliechthrus leucolophus.
2006 IUCN Red List of Threatened Species. Downloaded on 24 July 2007.

white-crowned cuckoo
Birds of New Guinea
Taxa named by Salomon Müller
white-crowned cuckoo
Taxonomy articles created by Polbot